Fires is a 1936 prose book by the French writer Marguerite Yourcenar. It consists of aphorisms, prose poetry and fragmentary diary entries alluding to a love story.

Reception
Stephen Koch reviewed the book for The New York Times in 1981, and described it as an "unwritten novel", a type of fragmentary book he compared to works by Rainer Maria Rilke, Colette, Cyril Connolly, and Roland Barthes: "These books insist - on everypage - that they are not novels. They refuse to be novels. Yet through their fragmented alternatives, we still can glimpse the novels they refuse to be - tales otherwise untellable, masked and revealed - for reasons ranging from discretion to despair to a certain visionary breathlessness. ... The unwritten novel among the fantasies and aphorisms of Fires is a classic tale."

See also
 1936 in literature
 20th-century French literature

References

1936 books
French books
Works by Marguerite Yourcenar
Éditions Grasset books
Books of aphorisms